Selliguea plantaginea is a fern species in the genus Selliguea.

A holotype, collected on the Iles du Vent, Tahiti, in 1838 during the Wilkes expedition, is held at United States National Herbarium, Smithsonian Institution (Herbarium code: US)

Description
Selliguea plantaginea has often been confused with S. feeoides, but differs in that S. feeoides has frequent hydathodes on the upper surface of the fronds, while in S. plantaginea, hydathodes are absent or infrequent.

Distribution
Selliguea plantaginea has been found in Sulawesi, New Guinea, Fiji, the Society Islands (Tahiti and Huahine).

Images
Sets of images from specimens found in the cloud forest on Mount Tohiea, Mo'orea may be found at http://n2t.net/ark:/21547/R2MBIO36935 and http://n2t.net/ark:/21547/R2MBIO40051.

References

External links
 Flora Malesiana: Selliguea plantaginea
 Google images: Selliguea plantaginea 
Hovenkamp, P (1998) An account of the Malay-Pacific species of Selliguea (Polypodiaceae). Blumea 43, 1-108.

plantaginea
Flora of New Guinea
Flora of French Polynesia
Flora of Sulawesi